The 19569/19570 Rajkot–Veraval Express is an Express train belonging to Western Railway zone that runs between  and  in India. It is currently being operated with 19569/19570 train numbers on a daily basis.

Service

19569/Rajkot–Veraval Express has an average speed of 42 km/hr and covers 185 km in 4 hrs 25 mins.
19570/Veraval–Rajkot Express has an average speed of 52 km/hr and covers 185 km in 4 hrs 25 mins.

Route and halts 

The important halts of the train are:

Coach composition

The train has standard ICF rakes with max speed of 110 kmph. The train consists of 20 coaches:

 1 AC II Tier
 2 AC III Tier
 6 Sleeper coaches
 9 General Unreserved
 1 Railway Mail Service
 2 Seating cum Luggage Rake

Traction

Both trains are hauled by a Sabarmati Loco Shed-based WDM-3A or WDP-4D diesel locomotive from Rajkot to Veraval and vice versa.

Rake sharing

The train shares its rake with 59423/59424 Rajkot–Somnath Passenger and 59421/59422 Rajkot–Veraval Passenger.

See also 

 Veraval Junction railway station
 Rajkot Junction railway station
 Rajkot–Veraval Passenger
 Rajkot–Somnath Passenger

References

Notes

External links 

 19569/Rajkot–Veraval Express India Rail Info
 19570/Veraval–Rajkot Express India Rail Info

Transport in Rajkot
Transport in Veraval
Rail transport in Gujarat
Express trains in India
Railway services introduced in 2017